Marta Moreta i Rovira (born 20 January 1969), is a Spanish Catalan pedagogue and politician.

Biography
She has a degree in pedagogy from the University of Girona and holds a degree in teaching from the University of Vic. She subsequently obtained a postgraduate in Local Government Management from the University of Barcelona and worked as director of the Community of Municipalities of Sant Hipòlit and Les Masies de Voltregà and head of services of the city council of the Masies de Voltregà from 2003 to 2015.

In 2008, she joined the PSC, a party of which has been the Municipal Policy Secretary and councilor of the city council of Manlleu in the municipal elections of 2011. She has been elected to the elections to the Parliament of Catalonia in 2015 and those of 2017 after the dissolution of the Parliament in application of article 155 of the Spanish Constitution.

References

1969 births
21st-century Spanish women politicians
Living people
Members of the 11th Parliament of Catalonia
Members of the 12th Parliament of Catalonia
Municipal councillors in the province of Barcelona
People from Vic
Socialists' Party of Catalonia politicians
Spanish Socialist Workers' Party politicians
University of Barcelona alumni
University of Girona alumni
Women members of the Parliament of Catalonia